The 2013 Liga Indonesia Second Division season is the eighteenth edition of Liga Indonesia Second Division since its establishment in 1995. This season is also the last season of this league before dissolved. The competition is managed by Badan Liga Sepakbola Amatir Indonesia (BLAI, Indonesia Amateur League Board).

Persinab Nabire is the last season champion version BLAI and Nusa Ina FC for LPIS version.

The competition starts on 28 September 2013 and finish on 15 December 2013.

Format
As with previous seasons, the competition system used in the Second Division this season is a home tournament with a round robin format. League is divided into three groups stage and knock-out round. In the first stage of the club is divided into 12 groups, group winner and runner-up advances to second stage. While the second stage is divided into four groups of six, the winner and runner-up of each group advances to third stage and also promotion to 2014 First Division season. In the third round the eight teams that qualify from the second round were divided into two groups of four, while the knockout consist of semi-finals and finals as well as the third place playoff.

First round
In this stage 73 teams divided into twelve group (four group of seven, five group of six and three group of five).

Source:Second Division 1st round table

Second round
In this stage 24 teams divided into six group of four, kick-off for this round began on 19 November 2013 except Group R which will begin on 24 November 2013. Winner and runner-up of each group advanced to third round and also promoted to First Division next season.

Source:Second Division 2nd round table

All match played in Teladan Stadium and TD. Pardede Stadium, Medan

All match played in Krakatau Steel Stadium and Sadag Stadium, Cilegon

All match played in Gelora Samudera Kuta and Yoga Parkhanti Stadium, Jimbaran

All match played in Bumi Moro Stadium and Persebaya field, Surabaya

All match played in Mulawarman Stadium and Taman Prestasi Stadium, Bontang

All match played in Pendidikan Stadium, Wamena

Third round
In this stage 12 teams divided into two group of six, kick-off for this round began on 5 to 11 December 2013. Winner from each group qualify for the final match.

Source:Second Division 3rd round table

All match played in Krakatau Steel Stadium, Cilegon

All match played in Noto Hadinegoro Stadium, Jember

Final

Champions

References

Liga Indonesia Second Division seasons
4